Hemmatabad (also Romanized as Hemmatābād) is a village in Meyami Rural District, in the Central District of Meyami County, Semnan Province, Iran. At the 2006 census, its population was 69, in 20 families.

References 

Populated places in Meyami County